Wambianna is a rural locality of Warren Shire and it is a civil parish of County of Ewenmar
Wambianna is on the Macquarie River east of Warren, New South Wales.

References

Localities in New South Wales
Geography of New South Wales
Central West (New South Wales)